The 1994–95 Seattle SuperSonics season was the 27th season for the Seattle SuperSonics in the National Basketball Association. During the off-season, the Sonics acquired Šarūnas Marčiulionis from the Golden State Warriors, and signed free agent Bill Cartwright, who won three championships with the Chicago Bulls. For the duration of the season, the Sonics switched venues and played their home games at the Tacoma Dome while their original stadium, the Seattle Center Coliseum, was being rebuilt to keep pace with NBA standards. The Sonics struggled with a 3–4 start to the season, but then won 13 of their next 16 games, then posted a 10-game winning streak in January, which led them to a successful 33–12 start at the All-Star break, despite a few team troubles along the way, and with Cartwright only playing just 29 games due to a groin injury. The team finished second in the Pacific Division with a 57–25 record.

Three members of the team, Gary Payton, Shawn Kemp and Detlef Schrempf were all selected for the 1995 NBA All-Star Game. Payton averaged 20.6 points, 7.1 assists and 2.5 steals per game, while Kemp averaged 18.7 points, 10.9 rebounds and 1.5 blocks per game, as both players were named to the All-NBA Second Team. In addition, Detlef Schrempf averaged 19.2 points, 6.2 rebounds and 3.8 assists per game, and was selected to the All-NBA Third Team, while Kendall Gill contributed 13.7 points and 1.6 steals per game, and Sam Perkins provided the team with 12.7 points and 4.9 rebounds per game. Off the bench, Vincent Askew contributed 9.9 points per game, while Marčiulionis contributed 9.3 points per game, and defensive guard Nate McMillan averaged 5.2 points, 5.3 assists and 2.1 steals per game. Payton also made the NBA All-Defensive First Team, while McMillan was selected to the NBA All-Defensive Second Team. Payton also finished in ninth place in Most Valuable Player voting, and McMillan finished in fourth place in Sixth Man of the Year voting.

However, after a shocking first round exit in the 1994 NBA Playoffs against the 8th-seeded Denver Nuggets, the Seattle franchise would once again exit early in the 1995 Playoffs. After winning Game 1 of the Western Conference First Round, at home over the 5th-seeded Los Angeles Lakers, 96–71, the Sonics lost the next three games to the Lakers, thus the series.

During the season, Gill and head coach George Karl both feuded with each other in public, as Gill dealt with depression. Following the season, Gill was traded back to his former team, the Charlotte Hornets, while Marčiulionis was dealt to the Sacramento Kings, and Cartwright retired.

Draft picks

Roster

Regular season

Season standings

z – clinched division title
y – clinched division title
x – clinched playoff spot

Record vs. opponents

Game log

|- align="center" bgcolor="#ccffcc"
| 1
| November 5
| Utah
| 110–103
| Detlef Schrempf (26)
| Detlef Schrempf (12)
| Schrempf & Nate McMillan (4)
| Tacoma Dome  16,324
| 1–0
|- align="center" bgcolor="#ffcccc"
| 2
| November 9
| Sacramento
| 100–108
| Shawn Kemp (21)
| Shawn Kemp (9)
| Schrempf & McMillan (5)
| Tacoma Dome  16,352
| 1–1
|- align="center" bgcolor="#ccffcc"
| 3
| November 11
| Phoenix
| 129–123
| Shawn Kemp (26)
| Ervin Johnson (9)
| McMillan & Gary Payton (6)
| Tacoma Dome  16,352
| 2–1
|- align="center" bgcolor="#ffcccc"
| 4
| November 13
| L.A. Clippers
| 115–90
| Vincent Askew (20)
| Shawn Kemp (11)
| Nate McMillan (6)
| Tacoma Dome  16,352
| 3–1
|- align="center" bgcolor="#ffcccc"
| 5
| November 15
| @ New Jersey
| 106–112
| Shawn Kemp (26)
| Shawn Kemp (13)
| Gary Payton (6)
| Brendan Byrne Arena  15,310
| 3–2
|- align="center" bgcolor="#ffcccc"
| 6
| November 16
| @ Boston
| 93–120
| Detlef Schrempf (19)
| Shawn Kemp (10)
| Nate McMillan (7)
| Boston Garden  14,890
| 3–3
|- align="center" bgcolor="#ffcccc"
| 7
| November 18
| @ Indiana
| 87–94
| Gary Payton (21)
| Detlef Schrempf (11)
| Gary Payton (4)
| Market Square Arena  16,627
| 3–4
|- align="center" bgcolor="#ccffcc"
| 8
| November 19
| @ Milwaukee
| 120–96
| Gary Payton (25)
| Shawn Kemp (11)
| Gary Payton (7)
| Bradley Center  18,633
| 4–4
|- align="center" bgcolor="#ccffcc"
| 9
| November 22
| New Jersey
| 104–97
| Gary Payton (26)
| Shawn Kemp (17)
| Gary Payton (9)
| Tacoma Dome  13,574
| 5–4
|- align="center" bgcolor="#ffcccc"
| 10
| November 23
| @ Utah
| 103–113
| Šarūnas Marčiulionis (21)
| Vincent Askew (6)
| Gary Payton (8)
| Delta Center 19,911
| 5–5
|- align="center" bgcolor="#ccffcc"
| 11
| November 25
| @ San Antonio
| 114–94
| Gary Payton (21)
| Shawn Kemp (10)
| Gary Payton (7)
| Alamodome  19,016
| 6–5
|- align="center" bgcolor="#ccffcc"
| 12
| November 26, 1994  5:30p.m. PST
| @ Houston
| W 98–94
| Kemp & Sam PerkinsPerkins (22)
| Kemp (12)
| Payton (5)
| The Summit  16,611
| 7–5
|- align="center" bgcolor="#ccffcc"
| 13
| November 28
| Indiana
| 118–99
| Gary Payton (28)
| Ervin Johnson (14)
| Gary Payton (7)
| Tacoma Dome  14,647
| 8–5
|- align="center" bgcolor="#ccffcc"
| 14
| November 30
| San Antonio
| 109–100
| Gary Payton (21)
| Detlef Schrempf (7)
| Gary Payton (6)
| Tacoma Dome  14,793
| 9–5

|- align="center" bgcolor="#ccffcc"
| 15
| December 3
| Milwaukee
| 111–108
| Shawn Kemp (26)
| Shawn Kemp (15)
| Payton & McMillan (9)
| Tacoma Dome  14,661
| 10–5
|- align="center" bgcolor="#ccffcc"
| 16
| December 6, 1994  5:00p.m. PST
| Houston
| W 103–90
| Payton (30)
| Kemp (9)
| Payton (8)
| Tacoma Dome  13,017
| 11–5
|- align="center" bgcolor="#ffcccc"
| 17
| December 8
| @ Sacramento
| 91–103
| Vincent Askew (17)
| Shawn Kemp (19)
| Detlef Schrempf (8)
| ARCO Arena  17,317
| 11–6
|- align="center" bgcolor="#ccffcc"
| 18
| December 10
| @ L.A. Clippers
| 132–127 (2 OT)
| Shawn Kemp (42)
| Shawn Kemp (14)
| Gary Payton (14)
| Los Angeles Memorial Sports Arena  9,048
| 12–6
|- align="center" bgcolor="#ffcccc"
| 19
| December 14
| @ Phoenix
| 93–111
| Gary Payton (16)
| Shawn Kemp (14)
| Gary Payton (6)
| America West Arena  19,023
| 12–7
|- align="center" bgcolor="#ccffcc"
| 20
| December 15
| Portland
| 114–103
| Shawn Kemp (26)
| Shawn Kemp (8)
| Gary Payton (9)
| Tacoma Dome  13,151
| 13–7
|- align="center" bgcolor="#ccffcc"
| 21
| December 17
| Orlando
| 124–84
| Gary Payton (31)
| Shawn Kemp (14)
| Gary Payton (7)
| Tacoma Dome  16,832
| 14–7
|- align="center" bgcolor="#ccffcc"
| 22
| December 20
| L.A. Clippers
| 110–79
| Shawn Kemp (23)
| Shawn Kemp (13)
| Gary Payton (9)
| Tacoma Dome  11,952
| 15–7
|- align="center" bgcolor="#ccffcc"
| 23
| December 22
| Dallas
| 103–101
| Gary Payton (28)
| Shawn Kemp (10)
| Gary Payton (8)
| Tacoma Dome  14,763
| 16–7
|- align="center" bgcolor="#ffcccc"
| 24
| December 25
| @ Denver
| 96–105
| Kendall Gill & Schrempf (21)
| Detlef Schrempf (6)
| Gary Payton (4)
| McNichols Sports Arena  17,171
| 16–8
|- align="center" bgcolor="#ccffcc"
| 25
| December 26
| Sacramento
| 123–103
| Sam Perkins (26)
| Shawn Kemp (9)
| Detlef Schrempf (8)
| Tacoma Dome  15,780
| 17–8
|- align="center" bgcolor="#ccffcc"
| 26
| December 28
| Philadelphia
| 121–102
| Kendall Gill (25)
| Shawn Kemp (9)
| Nate McMillan (10)
| Tacoma Dome  15,787
| 18–8
|- align="center" bgcolor="#ffcccc"
| 27
| December 29
| @ L.A. Lakers
| 95–96
| Detlef Schrempf (26)
| Shawn Kemp (13)
| Gary Payton (11)
| Great Western Forum  17,505
| 18–9

|- align="center" bgcolor="#ccffcc"
| 28
| January 3
| @ Washington
| 121–107
| Gary Payton (24)
| Shawn Kemp (8)
| Nate McMillan (9)
| US Airways Arena  16,940
| 19–9
|- align="center" bgcolor="#ccffcc"
| 29
| January 4
| @ Cleveland
| 116–85
| Gary Payton (32)
| Schrempf, Johnson & Kemp (6)
| Gary Payton & Detlef Schrempf (6)
| Gund Arena  20,562
| 20–9
|- align="center" bgcolor="#ccffcc"
| 30
| January 6
| @ Chicago
| 108–101
| Kemp & Schrempf (23)
| Bill Cartwright & Kemp (9)
| Gary Payton (13)
| United Center  22,248
| 21–9
|- align="center" bgcolor="#ccffcc"
| 31
| January 10
| @ Golden State
| 128–118 OT
| Detlef Schrempf (33)
| Detlef Schrempf (16)
| McMillan & Payton (13)
| Oakland–Alameda County Coliseum Arena  15,025
| 22–9
|- align="center" bgcolor="#ccffcc"
| 32
| January 13
| L.A. Clippers
| 108–101
| Detlef Schrempf (23)
| Shawn Kemp (14)
| Gary Payton (11)
| Tacoma Dome  13,836
| 23–9
|- align="center" bgcolor="#ccffcc"
| 33
| January 15
| Portland
| 131–124
| Gary Payton (29)
| Sam Perkins (10)
| Gary Payton (9)
| Tacoma Dome  16,950
| 24–9
|- align="center" bgcolor="#ccffcc"
| 34
| January 17
| Cleveland
| 115–91
| Detlef Schrempf (21)
| Shawn Kemp (11)
| Nate McMillan (7)
| Tacoma Dome  12,914
| 25–9
|- align="center" bgcolor="#ccffcc"
| 35
| January 19
| @ Minnesota
| 102–87
| Detlef Schrempf (22)
| Shawn Kemp (13)
| Gary Payton (8)
| Target Center  13,396
| 26–9
|- align="center" bgcolor="#ccffcc"
| 36
| January 21
| @ Dallas
| 117–91
| Gary Payton (22)
| Detlef Schrempf (29)
| Gary Payton (8)
| Reunion Arena  17,502
| 27–9
|- align="center" bgcolor="#ccffcc"
| 37
| January 24
| Denver
| 111–89
| Shawn Kemp (19)
| Schrempf (9)
| Gary Payton (8)
| Tacoma Dome  16,352
| 28–9
|- align="center" bgcolor="#ffcccc"
| 38
| January 26
| Utah
| 108–120
| Shawn Kemp (19)
| Shawn Kemp (12)
| Kemp, McMillan, Payton (5)
| Tacoma Dome  14,835
| 28–10
|- align="center" bgcolor="#ffcccc"
| 39
| January 28
| L.A. Lakers
| 121–128 (OT)
| Detlef Schrempf (26)
| Detlef Schrempf (10)
| Gary Payton (13)
| Tacoma Dome  17,426
| 28–11
|- align="center" bgcolor="#ccffcc"
| 40
| January 30
| @ Philadelphia
| 109–104
| Sam Perkins (31)
| Shawn Kemp (8)
| McMillan & Payton (9)
| CoreStates Spectrum  13,892
| 29–11

|- align="center" bgcolor="#ccffcc"
| 41
| February 2
| @ Orlando
| 106–103
| Gary Payton (26)
| Shawn Kemp (12)
| Nate McMillan (8)
| Orlando Arena  16,010
| 30–11
|- align="center" bgcolor="#ccffcc"
| 42
| February 3
| @ Atlanta
| 121–98
| Gary Payton (22)
| Kendall Gill (8)
| Gary Payton (9)
| Omni Coliseum  14,083
| 31–11
|- align="center" bgcolor="#ccffcc"
| 43
| February 5
| @ Miami
| 136–109
| Shawn Kemp (26)
| Shawn Kemp (11)
| Nate McMillan (12)
| Miami Arena  14,852
| 32–11
|- align="center" bgcolor="#ffcccc"
| 44
| February 7
| San Antonio
| 103–106
| Kendall Gill (24)
| Detlef Schrempf (14)
| Gary Payton (10)
| Tacoma Dome  15,083
| 32–12
|- align="center" bgcolor="#ccffcc"
| 45
| February 9
| Chicago
| 126–118 OT
| Shawn Kemp (30)
| Sam Perkins (10)
| Payton & Schrempf (8)
| Tacoma Dome  16,079
| 33–12
|- align="center"
|colspan="9" bgcolor="#bbcaff"|All-Star Break
|- style="background:#cfc;"
|- bgcolor="#bbffbb"
|- align="center" bgcolor="#ccffcc"
| 46
| February 14
| Golden State
| 118–108
| Gary Payton (26)
| Sam Perkins (12)
| Nate McMillan (10)
| Tacoma Dome  13,918
| 34–12
|- align="center" bgcolor="#ffcccc"
| 47
| February 15
| @ L.A. Lakers
| 96–102
| Gary Payton (24)
| Shawn Kemp (12)
| Kendall Gill (7)
| Great Western Forum  14,936
| 34–13
|- align="center" bgcolor="#ffcccc"
| 48
| February 17
| @ Portland
| 109–114
| Shawn Kemp (30)
| Shawn Kemp (7)
| Gary Payton (10)
| Veterans Memorial Coliseum  12,888
| 34–14
|- align="center" bgcolor="#ccffcc"
| 49
| February 18
| @ Golden State
| 129–117
| Detlef Schrempf (31)
| Sam Perkins & Schrempf (9)
| Gary Payton (7)
| Oakland–Alameda County Coliseum Arena  15,025
| 35–14
|- align="center" bgcolor="#ffcccc"
| 50
| February 20
| L.A. Lakers
| 105–108
| Detlef Schrempf (26)
| Shawn Kemp (14)
| Gary Payton (9)
| Tacoma Dome  16,502
| 35–15
|- align="center" bgcolor="#ccffcc"
| 51
| February 22
| Minnesota
| 120–104
| Kendall Gill (34)
| Shawn Kemp (13)
| Gary Payton (13)
| Tacoma Dome  13,012
| 36–15
|- align="center" bgcolor="#ccffcc"
| 52
| February 24
| Denver
| 90–86
| Detlef Schrempf (22)
| Detlef Schrempf (9)
| Payton & Schrempf (8)
| Tacoma Dome  18,056
| 37–15
|- align="center" bgcolor="#ffcccc"
| 53
| February 27
| Charlotte
| 114–116
| Gary Payton (32)
| Shawn Kemp (8)
| Detlef Schrempf (9)
| Tacoma Dome  16,379
| 37–16

|- align="center" bgcolor="#ccffcc"
| 54
| March 2
| @ L.A. Clippers
| 116–88
| Kemp & Marčiulionis (21)
| Kemp & Gill (7)
| Gary Payton (7)
| Arrowhead Pond  17,873
| 38–16
|- align="center" bgcolor="#ffcccc"
| 55
| March 3
| @ Phoenix
| 118–122 (OT)
| Detlef Schrempf (31)
| Shawn Kemp (13)
| McMillan, Payton, & Schrempf (8)
| America West Arena  19,023
| 38–17
|- align="center" bgcolor="#ffcccc"
| 56
| March 6
| Golden State
| 103–106
| Detlef Schrempf (23)
| Shawn Kemp (16)
| Nate McMillan (8)
| Tacoma Dome  13,442
| 38–18
|- align="center" bgcolor="#ccffcc"
| 57
| March 8
| @ Minnesota
| 118–104
| Detlef Schrempf (27)
| Shawn Kemp (9)
| Gary Payton (8)
| Target Center  14,339
| 39–18
|- align="center" bgcolor="#ffcccc"
| 58
| March 9
| @ Charlotte
| 99–112
| Kendall Gill (23)
| Kendall Gill (11)
| Gill & Payton (5)
| Charlotte Coliseum  23,698
| 39–19
|- align="center" bgcolor="#ccffcc"
| 59
| March 11
| @ New York
| 96–84
| Kemp & Schrempf (22)
| Shawn Kemp (19)
| Gary Payton (8)
| Madison Square Garden  19,763
| 40–19
|- align="center" bgcolor="#ccffcc"
| 60
| March 12
| @ Detroit
| 134–94
| Shawn Kemp (25)
| Shawn Kemp (16)
| Nate McMillan (8)
| The Palace at Auburn Hills  16,235
| 41–19
|- align="center" bgcolor="#ccffcc"
| 61
| March 14
| Boston
| 113–93
| Detlef Schrempf (23)
| Shawn Kemp (11)
| Nate McMillan (9)
| Tacoma Dome  16,296
| 42–19
|- align="center" bgcolor="#ccffcc"
| 62
| March 16
| Miami
| 103–78
| Detlef Schrempf (20)
| Shawn Kemp (16)
| Gary Payton (7)
| Tacoma Dome  15,257
| 43–18
|- align="center" bgcolor="#ccffcc"
| 63
| March 18
| Detroit
| 133–110
| Payton & Schrempf (25)
| Shawn Kemp (11)
| Nate McMillan (9)
| Tacoma Dome  17,326
| 44–19
|- align="center" bgcolor="#ffcccc"
| 64
| March 20
| @ San Antonio
| 96–104
| Shawn Kemp (23)
| Shawn Kemp (12)
| Gary Payton (6)
| Alamodome  19,798
| 44–20
|- align="center" bgcolor="#ccffcc"
| 65
| March 21, 1995  5:30p.m. PST
| @ Houston
| W 104–102
| Marčiulionis (20)
| Kemp (12)
| McMillan & Payton (6)
| The Summit  16,611
| 45–20
|- align="center" bgcolor="#ccffcc"
| 66
| March 23
| Washington
| 108–103
| Payton & Schrempf (24)
| Shawn Kemp (13)
| Gary Payton (9)
| Tacoma Dome  13,775
| 46–20
|- align="center" bgcolor="#ccffcc"
| 67
| March 24
| @ Portland
| 112–118
| Gary Payton (32)
| Shawn Kemp (13)
| Payton & Schrempf (7)
| Veterans Memorial Coliseum  12,888
| 47–20
|- align="center" bgcolor="#ccffcc"
| 68
| March 26
| New York
| 93–82
| Gary Payton (26)
| Shawn Kemp (9)
| Payton & Perkins (4)
| Tacoma Dome  18,056
| 48–20
|- align="center" bgcolor="#ccffcc"
| 69
| March 29
| Minnesota
| 109–92
| Gary Payton (33)
| Shawn Kemp (11)
| Payton & Marčiulionis (6)
| Tacoma Dome  12,336
| 49–20
|- align="center" bgcolor="#ccffcc"
| 70
| March 31
| Sacramento
| 120–95
| Gary Payton (27)
| Shawn Kemp (12)
| Šarūnas Marčiulionis (6)
| Tacoma Dome  14,698
| 50–20

|- align="center" bgcolor="#ccffcc"
| 71
| April 2
| Atlanta
| 105–83
| Payton & Kemp (21)
| Shawn Kemp (18)
| McMillan & Payton (6)
| Tacoma Dome  17,368
| 51–20
|- align="center" bgcolor="#ffcccc"
| 72
| April 4
| @ Utah
| 92–114
| Gary Payton (26)
| Shawn Kemp (9)
| Gary Payton (6)
| Delta Center  19,911
| 52–21
|- align="center" bgcolor="#ccffcc"
| 73
| April 6
| @ Denver
| 106–100
| Detlef Schrempf (27)
| Shawn Kemp (18)
| Gary Payton & Schrempf (4)
| McNichols Sports Arena  17,171
| 52–21
|- align="center" bgcolor="#ccffcc"
| 74
| April 8
| @ Dallas
| 125–98
| Detlef Schrempf (22)
| Johnson & Kemp (12)
| Gary Payton (8)
| Reunion Arena  17,502
| 53–21
|- align="center" bgcolor="#ffcccc"
| 75
| April 11
| Phoenix
| 90–96
| Shawn Kemp (27)
| Shawn Kemp (15)
| Gary Payton (6)
| Tacoma Dome  18,036
| 53–22
|- align="center" bgcolor="#ccffcc"
| 76
| April 13
| Dallas
| 133–112
| Gary Payton (24)
| Shawn Kemp (19)
| Nate McMillan (15)
| Tacoma Dome  15,900
| 54–22
|- align="center" bgcolor="#ccffcc"
| 77
| April 15
| @ Golden State
| 115–99
| Gary Payton (24)
| Shawn Kemp (13)
| Gary Payton (10)
| Oakland–Alameda County Coliseum Arena  15,025
| 55–22
|- align="center" bgcolor="#ffcccc"
| 78
| April 17
| Portland
| 93–97
| Detlef Schrempf (25)
| Kemp & Johnson (7)
| Gary Payton (6)
| Tacoma Dome  16,659
| 55–23
|- align="center" bgcolor="#ccffcc"
| 79
| April 18
| @ L.A. Lakers
| 113–97
| Gary Payton (28)
| Kemp & Johnson (14)
| Nate McMillan (13)
| Great Western Forum  17,505
| 56–23
|- align="center" bgcolor="#ccffcc"
| 80
| April 20, 1995  7:00p.m. PDT
| Houston
| W 111–101
| Payton (25)
| Kemp (13)
| Payton (7)
| Tacoma Dome  18,056
| 57–23
|- align="center" bgcolor="#ffcccc"
| 81
| April 21
| @ Sacramento
| 97–105
| Detlef Schrempf (26)
| Shawn Kemp (7)
| Detlef Schrempf (10)
| ARCO Arena  17,317
| 57–24
|- align="center" bgcolor="#ffcccc"
| 82
| April 23
| @ Phoenix
| 100–105
| Detlef Schrempf (18)
| Shawn Kemp (13)
| Kemp & Payton (5)
| America West Arena  19,023
| 57–25

Playoffs

|- align="center" bgcolor="#ccffcc"
| 1
| April 27
| L.A. Lakers
| W 96–71
| Shawn Kemp (21)
| Kemp, Perkins (7)
| Nate McMillan (8)
| Tacoma Dome14,073
| 1–0
|- align="center" bgcolor="#ffcccc"
| 2
| April 29
| L.A. Lakers
| L 82–84
| Shawn Kemp (22)
| Shawn Kemp (12)
| Gary Payton (6)
| Tacoma Dome14,681
| 1–1
|- align="center" bgcolor="#ffcccc"
| 3
| May 1
| @ L.A. Lakers
| L 101–105
| Shawn Kemp (30)
| Shawn Kemp (11)
| Nate McMillan (10)
| Great Western Forum17,505
| 1–2
|- align="center" bgcolor="#ffcccc"
| 4
| May 4
| @ L.A. Lakers
| L 110–114
| Gary Payton (27)
| Shawn Kemp (18)
| three players tied (6)
| Great Western Forum17,505
| 1–3

Player statistics

Season

Playoffs

Awards and records

Awards
All-NBA Teams 
 Shawn Kemp – All-NBA Second Team
 Gary Payton – All-NBA Second Team
 Detlef Schrempf – All-NBA Third Team

NBA All-Defensive Teams 
 Gary Payton – All-Defensive First Team
 Nate McMillan – All-Defensive Second Team

1995 NBA All-Star Game 
 Shawn Kemp (third participation, second as a starter)
 Gary Payton (second participation)
 Detlef Schrempf (second participation)

Transactions

Trades

Free agents

Player Transactions Citation:

See also
 1994–95 NBA season

References

Seattle SuperSonics seasons